Baginton is a village and civil parish in the Warwick district of Warwickshire, England, and has a common border with the City of Coventry / West Midlands county. The population had reduced slightly to 755 at the 2011 Census. The Lucy Price playing field is situated centrally in the village.

Geography and administration
Coventry Airport (built 1936), the Lunt Roman Fort and the ancient "Baginton oak" tree are within the village, whilst the Midland Air Museum is just outside Baginton. The road from Baginton to southern Coventry (the city's Finham district) passes over the River Sowe near an old mill, which now is inhabited by a restaurant and hotel called The Old Mill. Baginton is often misspelt / mispronounced as 'Bagington'.

History
The Domesday Book of 1086 records that in the 11th century, Baginton consisted of 15 households and a mill.

Archaeology 
In December 2019, Roman and Anglo-Saxon artifacts, including pottery, jugs, and jewelry, were unearthed from burial grounds by archaeologists led by Nigel Page. The team of researchers believed that two of the graves belonged to a "high-status" rank officer and a Roman girl aged 6–12 years old. Findings from the Roman cremation burial site of a young girl included four brooches, a ring with an image of a cicada and a hair pin.

Coventry Airport

Baginton is the site of Coventry Airport, which lies just southeast of the village. First opened in 1936 as Baginton Aerodrome, it has been used for general aviation, flight training and commercial freight and passenger flights. It had a grass surface for aeroplanes to land and take off. With the Second World War it became a fighter airfield. By October 1941, No. 308 Polish Fighter Squadron was located at Baginton. The Midland Air Museum on Rowley Road is adjacent to the northern boundary of Coventry Airport.

Landmarks
The remains of the ancient Roman Lunt Fort have been found in Baginton on the north side of the village. Parts of the fort were reconstructed in the 1970s, and it has become a popular site for school visits, as well as holding activity days during the summer. The Church of St John the Baptist is situated in the old part of Baginton. A scenic footpath starts near the church and leads to Stoneleigh. Baginton is the site of an old oak tree which is often called the Baginton oak. It is about 300–350 years old and is thought to be one of the oldest trees in Warwickshire. A nearby public house is called The Oak.

Henry Percy was imprisoned at Baginton Castle following his son Harry Hotspur's defeat at the Battle of Shrewsbury. The ruin that can be seen is of a late fourteenth-century house, but it is not well known due to its location in an area of woodland on private land. If Baginton Castle did exist here before this house, there is no sign of its ruins. Baginton Castle and Fish Ponds constitute a Scheduled Monument. The vestiges of the castle are a Grade II listed building. The site was opened to the public in 2009.

Gallery

References

Sources

Domesday Book
Dugdale, Sir W. 1730 The Antiquities of Warwickshire, 2nd Ed. (ed. W. Thomas), London 
Edwards, J.H. 1953 'Baginton Castle Excavations', Trans. Birm. Warwicks. Arch. Soc., 69 (1951), 44–49.
Smith, W. 1829 A New and Complete History of the County of Warwick, Birmingham

External links

 Baginton Village Website
 Detailed historic record for Baginton Castle
 

Villages in Warwickshire